Forest Hill with Shotover is a civil parish covering 7.56 km² of South Oxfordshire approximately centred  east of Oxford. Its population in 2011 was 856, almost exclusively in the villages of Forest Hill, hamlets of Shotover Cleve and Shotover Edge.  It includes a country estate at Shotover Park. Forest Hill with Shotover was formed in 1881 by the merger of three smaller civil parishes: Forest Hill, Shotover and Shotover Hill Place.

Sources

References

Civil parishes in Oxfordshire
South Oxfordshire District